Libertas "Libs" Schulze-Boysen, born Libertas Viktoria Haas-Heye (20 November 1913 in Paris – 22 December 1942 in Plötzensee Prison ) was a German aristocrat and resistance fighter against the Nazis.  From the early 1930s to 1940, Libs attempted to build a literary career, initially as a press officer and later as a writer and journalist. Initially sympathetic to the Nazis as her family had close links to the most senior levels of the regime, she changed her mind after meeting and marrying Luftwaffe officer Harro Schulze-Boysen.

Starting in about 1935, the couple held regular discussion meetings with their friends, that would end as a party. As an aristocrat, Libs had contact with many different people in different strata of German society, which enabled her to recruit left-leaning members into the group. Through these discussions, resistance to the Nazi regime grew and by 1936, she and Harro began to actively resist the Nazis.  

During the early 1940s, Libs began to document the atrocities committed by the Nazis, when she worked as a censor for the Deutsche Kulturfilm-Zentrale and found pictures on her desk that had been forwarded by soldiers of the Sonderbehandlungen task force. By 1940, the couple came into contact with other Berlin-based anti-fascist resistance groups and cooperated with them. The most important of these was run by Arvid Harnack. From June 1941, their underground resistance group became an espionage group that supplied military and economic intelligence to the Soviet Union. That organisation became known as the Red Orchestra ("Rote Kapelle") by the Abwehr. Libs was arrested in September 1942, a month after her husband Harro, and both were executed on the same day.

Life

Libertas Schulze-Boysen was the youngest of three children. Her father was Heidelberg-born, Otto Ludwig Haas-Heye, couturier to aristocracy, and her mother was noted pianist Viktoria Ada Astrid Agnes Gräfin zu Eulenburg. They were Protestants who believed in providing a religious upbringing to their children. Libertas never became overtly religious to an extent that dictated her existence, although many of her early poems and later letters show her strong Christian roots. Her sister was Countess Ottora Maria Douglas-Reimer (1910-2001), who married Count Carl Ludvig Douglas (1908–1961), a Swedish diplomat. The couple had four children, their first son was Count Gustav Archibald Sigvart Douglas (b. 1938), a stockbroker, their first daughter was Princess Elisabeth Christina Douglas (b. 1940), their second daughter Rosita Spencer-Churchill, Duchess of Marlborough (b. 1943), an artist and their youngest son, Carl Philipp Morton, a civil engineer. Her older brother,  (1912-2008), was a journalist and diplomat.

Her mother was known as "Thora" spelled "Tora" and came from an old Prussian noble family. She was the youngest of eight children of the Prussian diplomat and composer Prince Philipp zu Eulenburg and Swedish former Countess Augusta, Princess of Eulenburg. Philipp zu Eulenburg was a close friend of Kaiser Wilhelm Friedrich Ludwig and his Swedish wife, Augusta Gräfin Sandels (1853–1941). Eulenburg and William I were allegedly lovers. The allegation were published as a series of articles by influential Berlin journalist Maximilian Harden in the Berlin newspapers between 1907 and 1909. It ran so long it became known as Eulenburg affair.

In 1921, when Libertas was eight years old, her parents divorced (unusual at the time) and her grandfather died. Libertas spent part of her childhood at Eulenburg's country estate, Liebenberg Castle, near Berlin taught initially by a governess.  

From 1922, she attended a school in Berlin and lived with her father, who headed the fashion department of the Kunstgewerbemuseum. Later a co-worker of her father, artist Valerie Wolffenstein supervised her, when she spent a summer in Switzerland in 1924, learning to draw. Between 1926 and 1932, Schulze-Boysen was sent to be educated at boarding schools in Paris, London and Switzerland.

In 1932, Schulze-Boysen completed her Abitur at a girls' finishing school in Zurich, followed by a 9-month stay in Ireland and the United Kingdom. After returning in January 1933, Schulze-Boysen attended a Nazi torchlight procession that marched past the Reich Chancellery. Though not totally understanding of the new and powerful German Youth Movement, she was impressed enough with them to join the Nazi Party with member number 1 551 344, in March 1933,  and at the same time the League of German Girls (German: Bund Deutscher Mädel).

As a press officer
In the same year, Schulze-Boysen moved to Berlin after being hired in May 1933 by the motion picture company Metro-Goldwyn-Mayer's (MGM), as a press officer, informing the media about new cinematic releases. During the spring of 1933,  the film studio had sacked all its Jewish staff leaving it short-staffed. Initially, Libertas worked on press copy for the American films Sons of the Desert and Dancing Lady, that were immediate success. In May 1933, the studio started to feel the effects of Nazi censorship, when it was forced to drop the screenplay by Herman Mankiewicz, called The Mad Dog of Europe that was meant to illuminate the treatment of Jews in Germany. Mankiewicz would later go on to write the screenplay for Citizen Kane.

In April 1934, Libertas met Harro Schulze-Boysen, while they were both sailing on the Wannsee. Harro Schulze-Boysen was a publisher of a left-liberal magazine Der Gegner (English: "The Opponent") in 1932–1933. It was closed down when he arrested by the Sturmabteilung in April 1933. He was badly beaten and lost half his ear and was only released due to the influence of his mother. He was left with damaged kidneys. His Jewish friend Henry Erlanger, who was arrested at the same time, never survived the beating. Every fortnight, his friends from Der Gegner held picnic-evenings in his apartment along with friends and colleagues in which they discussed philosophical and well as political questions of the day. To protect themselves from further persecution, the couple surrounded themselves with a group of politically incorruptible friends who were left-leaning anti-fascists, among them artists, pacifists and Communists.

In October 1934, the couple moved in together, in an apartment in Hohenzollerndamm, in the Wilmersdorf district of Berlin. On the 15 January 1935, Libs left to join the Reich Labour Service for female youth (Freiwilligen Arbeitsdienst für die weibliche Jugend) for six months voluntary work, near Glindow close to Potsdam. It is unknown why she left a promising career at MGM, to take voluntary service. However, on the 18 July 1935, she completed her six months voluntary service. Libs was so enthused by her experiences, that she decided to write a book. She submitted the manuscript to writer Ernst von Salomon, a family friend who worked at the Rowohlt publishing house. Salomon reviewed the book, believed it was good enough to publish, but had doubt whether the Nazis would allow it to be published. Libs wanted to submit the manuscript for review to the Reich Labour Service, but whether that happened is unknown. Salomon heard nothing further on that point.

Starting in July 1935, Schulze-Boysen began working on Harro's magazine Wille zum Reich (Will to empire) as an editor and translator. The magazine dealt with cultural policy issues but also with the goal of undermining the Nazi movement with its own themes. In August 1935, Harro was given permission to attend a series of lectures on the League of Nations in Geneva and Libertas accompanied him.

Marriage
In the way home, the couple stopped at the Château de Muzot to visit the last home of the Bohemian-Austrian poet and novelist Rainer Maria Rilke as well visit his tomb. They lived together for a year, before getting married on 26 July 1936. The wedding took place in the chapel of Liebenberg Castle under a painting of Guido Reni, with Hermann Göring giving away the bride. For their honeymoon, the couple visited Stockholm in Sweden, where Libs was introduced to her Swedish relatives. Harro has arranged a language study trip for his employer and he submitted a confidential report upon his return.

On 1 October 1936, the couple moved into an apartment at 2 Waitzstrasse in Charlottenburg.  At the same time the marriage ran into trouble. Due to pain in Harro's kidneys and the Swastika carved into his leg, he found lovemaking difficult. After sex, his urine would turn red. Libs realising the marriage was in trouble and influenced by the views of her husband, left the Nazi Party within the year. More in order to impress Harro and show commitment to the marriage.

At the end of 1936, Libs and Walter Küchenmeister, on the advice of Elisabeth Schumacher—wife of Kurt Schumacher—sought out Elfriede Paul, a doctor, who became a core member of the group.

Writer and journalist
On the 12 January 1938, Libs met playwright Günther Weisenborn who had been friends with Harro since 1932. As their relationship blossomed, Libertas and Weisenborn drew closer together, resulting in them both collaborating in writing a play Die guten Feinde (The Good Enemies). about the German physician Robert Koch. The plays premier was to be held at the theatre in Bremen in  November 1938, but was actually held on 1 March 1939. At the same time, Libs had signed a contract with Deutschlandsender for a production of a radio play  that was broadcast on 3 March 1939.

In April 1939, the couple moved into their new apartment at Altenburger Allee 19 in Charlottenburg, now the Westend.

From July 1940 to 13 November 1941, Libertas wrote film reviews for the culture section of the National-Zeitung. The task was difficult as she could not write freely or criticize, as the paper was under the control of Joseph Goebbels' propaganda ministry and the reviews had to include written text from the Zeitschriften-Dienst, that also described what could and could not be written about. Libs decided to cooperate in order to express herself and maintain influence. For films she liked, she would often write extravagantly, or in the form of a love letter. In other films that didn't find favour, she would write in a strict and formal manner. Originally a temporary position, it became permanent in the summer of 1941, but she became unsettled and decided to leave to try and achieve a film career. Her last article Resurrection the mask in art dance introduced the dancer Oda Schottmüller, to the general public and her successor as film critic was Adam Kuckhoff. Both were her and Harro's friends and both resisted the Nazis.

Resistance

The Spanish Civil War galvanised the inner circle of group in their discussions. Kurt Schumacher demanded that action should be taken and a plan, that took advantage of Harro's position at the ministry was formed. In February 1937, Harro compiled a short information document about a sabotage enterprise planned in Barcelona by the German Wehrmacht. It was an action from "Special Staff W", an organisation established by Luftwaffe general Helmuth Wilberg to study and analyse the tactical lessons learned by the Legion Kondor during the Spanish Civil War. The unit also directed the German relief operations that consisted of volunteers, weapons and ammunition for General Francisco Franco's FET y de las JONS. The information that Schulze-Boysen collected included details about German transports, deployment of units and companies involved in the German defence. The group around Schulze-Boysen did not know how to deliver the information, but discovered that Schulze-Boysen's cousin, Gisela von Pöllnitz, was planning to visit the Exposition Internationale des Arts et Techniques dans la Vie Moderne that was held in Paris from 25 May to 25 November 1937. The couple, fearing instant retribution from the Gestapo, decided to leave Berlin for several weeks. On the 27 September 1937, Harro left for a treatment for kidney stones at a sanatorium in Bad Wildungen, while Libs arranged a sea trip via a friend, on the cargo ship SS Ilona Siemers (1923) that left from the Hamburg port of St. Pauli, transporting coal to the Black Sea. She returned on Christmas Day 1937.

In 1938, looking to determine her fortune, Schulze-Boysen became a client of Anna Krauss, a well-known clairvoyant and fortune-teller.  Through Krauss, Libertas met Toni Graudenz, a neighbour. Her husband was John Graudenz. Schulze-Boysen introduced both Krauss and Graudenz into the resistance group.

In April 1939, Soviet intelligence officer of the GRU Anatoly Gurevich was ordered to travel from Brussels to Berlin to contact Harro Schulze-Boysen. He was hoping to revive Schulze-Boysen as an intelligence source and arrange communication with him via a courier service. Gurevich was given the telephone number of Schulze-Boysen and ordered to phone him and arrange a meeting somewhere in the city. He was not to meet him at his home, however. When Gurevich phoned, Libertas answered the phone. They met on the platform of an underground station, later moving to a cafe where Harro joined them.

The Kuckhoffs had known the Schulze-Boysens since 1938, having met them at a dinner party hosted by film producer Herbert Engelsing and his wife Ingeborg Engelsing, a close friend of Libertas and started to engage them socially in late 1939 or early 1940 when Greta brought Mildred and Libertas together while on holiday in Saxony. Other friends who joined their parties and who became staunch anti-nazis, that included the actor Werner Dissel who they met in 1935, Albrecht Haushofer, Kurt Schumacher and his wife Elisabeth Schumacher, Elfriede Paul, Walter Küchenmeister,  the writer Günther Weisenborn, the dancer and sculptress Oda Schottmüller as well as the actor Marta and editor Walter Husemann.

In August 1940, the Reich Ministry of Public Enlightenment and Propaganda created the Deutsche Kulturfilm-Zentrale (German Documentary Film Institute) whose purpose was to organise the production of ten to twenty minute long propaganda films that were to be shown in German film theatres, before the start of the main film, for the purpose of propaganda  Libertas applied for a position in the department of Kunst, deutsches Land und Volk, Völker und Länder (Art, German Land and People, Peoples and Countries) and was appointed on 1 November 1941. In the position she acted as a censor, reviewing films to determine if they adhered to Nazi Party ideology. Those that didn't she would reject; filmmakers who she found to be trying to innovative were passed. On her first day at work, she found her desk piled high with envelopes filled with photographs containing images of the work of the Sonderbehandlungen task forces.  For a long while Schulze-Boysen didn't know how to react to the material as it was so shocking but in collaboration with her assistant Alexander Spoerl, son of German author Heinrich Spoerl,  decided to start gathering pictorial evidence of Nazi war crimes, in anticipation of using them after the war too show the extent of the genocide. However, the number of pictures in envelopes continued to increase as more and more were delivered. Schulze-Boysen decided to answer some of the letters she received, to collect more details for after the war. In one photograph she archives, contains an image of a little girl next to her older brother, mother and a baby. All of them are to be shot. In another letter she received, a soldier spoke in lyrical terms of certain insects that he loved and couldn't harm, the potato beetle and included a photograph of him about to hurl a small baby against the wall. In January 1942, she wrote to her mother-in-law Marie Louise, where she described the work, which she completes at home and described how it made her deeply unhappy and melancholic.

+ gave up the ships journal in April 1941, Ohler 168 real
+ June 1941 marriage problems, job offers outside Berlin, Ohler 170 real

In 1941, Schulze-Boysen became an English language lecturer to teach translators the language.

+ Graudenz introduced 201 Ohler real
+ Introduce Annie Krauss as well.

In the autumn of 1941, Schulze-Boysen met Cato Bontjes van Beek an ardent anti-Nazi, while at a fair in Leipzig. Van Beek began to collaborate with Libs, in their resistance to the Nazi, by helping her write up the Nazi crimes in her archive.

+Cato drops out, Ohler 205 real

On the 29 October 1941, Schulze-Boysen  received a phone call from the Soviet intelligence officer, Anatoly Gurevich, and she put him in contact with her husband.

By 1942, the unrelenting stress of the resistance work began to tell. In the spring of 1942, she confided in Günther Weisenborn that for five years she had worked to resist the Nazis on behalf of Harro, but she found that she could not face the fear any longer. She yearned simply to live, in love and peace. On the 16 May 1942, she visited Vienna for several days to conduct a meeting with the Wien-Film film company. While she was away, the group protested the Nazi propaganda exhibition called The Soviet Paradise (German original title "Das Sowjet-Paradies") in Lustgarten, that had the express purpose of justifying the invasion of the Soviet Union to the German people. The protest took the form of  small stickers with a message Permanent Exhibition, The Nazi Paradise, War, Hunger, Lies, Gestapo, How much longer? that were pasted up in several German neighbourhoods.

Whe she returned from Vienna, she discovered Harro in flagrante with the actor Stella Mahlberg with whom he had been having an affair since April 1941. She immediately demanded a divorce stating she would seek the legal advice from Herbert Engelsing but Harro convinced her to stay, informing her that they knew too much about the resistance effort. Harro Schulze-Boysen continued the affair until August 1942. Libertas found the lack of emotional support highly distressing.

Discovery
The discovery of the illegal radio transmissions by Soviet agent Johann Wenzel by the German radio counterintelligence organization Funkabwehr and his capture by the Gestapo on 29–30 June 1942 eventually revealed the members of the group and led to the arrest of the Harnacks.  Wenzel decided to cooperate after he was tortured. His exposure of the radio codes enabled Referat 12, the cipher bureaux of the Funkabwehr, to decipher Red Orchestra message traffic. The unit had been tracking Red Orchestra radio transmissions since June 1941 and found Wenzels house in Brussels was found to contain a large number of coded messages. When Wilhelm Vauck, principal cryptographer of the Funkabwehr, the radio counterintelligence department of the Abwehr,  received the ciphers from Wenzel, he was able to decipher some of the older messages.  On 15 July 1942, Vauck managed to decrypt a message dated 10 October 1941that gave the locations of the Kuckhoff's and the Schulze-Boysen's apartments.

Arrest

On 31 August 1942, Harro Schulze-Boysen was arrested in his office in the Ministry of Aviation. Libertas had received a puzzling phone call from his office several days before. She was also warned by the women who delivered her mail that the Gestapo were monitoring it. Libertas's assistant Alexander Spoerl also noticed that Adam Kuckhoff had gone missing while working in Prague.  On the 7 September 1942, the Harnacks were arrested while on holiday.

Libertas suspected that Schulze-Boysen was arrested and contacted the Engelsings. Herbert Engelsing tried to contact Kuckhoff without result. Libertas and Spoerl both started to panic and frantically tried to warn others. They destroyed the darkroom at the Kulurefilm center and Libertas destroyed her meticulously collected archive. At home, she packed a suitcase with all Harro Schulze-Boysens papers and then tried to fabricate evidence of loyalty to the Nazi state by writing fake letters. She sent the suitcase to Günther Weisenborn in the vain hope that it could be hidden, and he tried to contact Harro Schulze-Boysen in vain.

On the 8 September, while on a train to visit friends in the Mosel Valley, Libertas was arrested. She was taken to the basement cells (German:Hausgefängnis) in the most dreaded address in all of German-occupied Europe, Reich Security Main Office headquarters at 8 Prinze-Albert strasse (Prince Albert street) containing department AMT IV, the Gestapo and put into protective custody (Schutzhäftlinge) by them.

In prison, Libertas met Gertrude Breiter, the secretary for Libertas' interrogator, Kommissar Alfred Göpfert. Libertas believed that Breiter was hostile to her superiors, seeing her more as a friend than an agent provocateur Breiter told Libertas that Göpfert didn't have any serious evidence against her and due to her family connections with Hermann Göring, her life would be safe. Libertas decided to confide in Breiter and talked with her more than a dozen times. In the course of their furtive conversations, Libertas told Breiter what she knew of the other prisoners, asked Breiter to deliver letters and asked for additional favors, primarily in the form of a typewriter to write poetry. In the three months Libertas was in prison, she wrote a number of remarkable letters and poems to her mother.

When the Gestapo informed her of Breiter's betrayal, Libertas was overwhelmed with remorse, stating in a letter to her mother, "I had to drink the bitter cup for now I learn that the person whom I had given my complete trust Gertrude Breiter had betrayed me." Her mother believed that Libertas had betrayed a number of the Schulze-Boysen/Harnack group.  However, in an unpublished interview with David Dallin after the war, Manfred Roeder, the advocate who prosecuted the Schulze-Boysens in the Reichskriegsgericht, stated that Libertas never betrayed anybody. Roeder credited the Funkspiel operation the Abwehr ran against the Red Orchestra radio operators for providing the necessary clues to identify the resistance members.

On 15 November 1942, Gurevich was brought back to Berlin where he was asked by the Gestapo on 22 November 1942 to identify the name of a woman in a picture. He identified her immediately as Libertas Schulze-Boysen. This provided definitive proof to the investigators that she was actively involved in the work of her husband.

Trial
She and her husband were brought before trial in the Reichskriegsgericht ("Reich Court Martial"). She was charged with "preparation" to commit high treason, helping the enemy and espionage. Her husband was charged with preparation to commit high treason, wartime treason, military sabotage and espionage. The trial ended on 19 December 1942 with death sentences for both her husband and her. Libertas Schulze-Boysen was executed by guillotine about 90 minutes  after her husband on 22 December 1942 at Plötzensee Prison in Berlin.

Honours
 The German writer  dedicated his 1950 novel Memoiren eines mittelmässigen Schülers (Memoirs of a Mediocre Student) to Libertas Schulze-Boysen.
 In the Berlin borough of Lichtenberg in 1972, a street was named after the Schulze-Boysens.
 The Libertas Chapel in Liebenberg Castle, where she married her husband Harro, is dedicated to her. Since 2004, a special exhibition by the Memorial to the German Resistance on the life of Libertas and the joint resistance within the Red Orchestra against Nazism has been on display here – documented with photographs and extensive writings.
 In 2017, two Stolperstein (stumbling stones) each for Libs and her husband Harro were laid in front of the steps of the entrance to the Liebenberg castle.

See also 
 Arvid Harnack
 Hans Coppi
 List of Germans who resisted Nazism
 Resistance during World War II

Literature
  
 
 
 Kettelhake, Silke (2008). 'Erzähl allen, allen von mir!' – Das schöne kurze Leben der Libertas Schulze-Boysen 1913–1942 (Tell everyone, everyone about me!' – The beautiful, short life of Libertas Schulze-Boysen, 1913–1942) Publisher: Droemer Verlag

References

Bibliography

External links 
 
 Douglas family archive

1913 births
1942 deaths
Red Orchestra (espionage)
Executed German Resistance members
People from Berlin executed at Plötzensee Prison
Reich Labour Service members
People executed by hanging at Plötzensee Prison
Executed German women
People executed for treason against Germany
German people of Swedish descent